Stuart Anderson may refer to:

 Stuart Anderson (Australian footballer) (born 1974), Australian rules footballer
 Stuart Anderson (Scottish footballer) (born 1986), Scottish footballer
 Stuart Anderson (American football) (born 1961), former American football linebacker
 Stuart Anderson (politician), British MP elected 2019
 Stuart Anderson (restaurateur) (1922–2016), American restaurateur
 Stewart Anderson (footballer) (1911–1997), Australian rules footballer
 Stewart Anderson (bowls) (born 1985), Scottish bowls player

See also
John Stuart Anderson (1908–1990), scientist